Constituencies in Scotland may refer to:
 Scottish Parliament constituencies and regions
 Scottish Westminster constituencies